Jasmine Smith may refer to:

Jasmine Curtis-Smith, actress
Jasmine Smith, played in 2011–12 West Coast Conference women's basketball season